Pride in the Desert is the annual LGBTQ pride event for Tucson, Arizona.

Similar to Phoenix Pride, Tucson does not hold a pride parade in the traditional month of June, due to high summer temperatures in Arizona.

History
The history of gay pride events in Tucson began after the 1976 murder of Richard Heakin. Heakin, who lived in Nebraska, visited a friend in Tucson and was beaten to death by four teenagers while exiting a bar named Stonewall Tavern. The attackers were subsequently tried as juveniles, and sentenced to probation. At the time, hate crimes were often not punished at all. Heakin's murder became a motivation behind the foundation of Tucson Pride.

The first Tucson pride event, organized by an organization named Tucson Gay Coalition, was named the Gay Pride Festival & Memorial Picnic. It was held at Himmel Park on June 26, 1977, also the National Gay Pride Day that year.

In 1982, the Tucson Gay Pride Festival was cancelled amidst a statewide call to fight against LGBT discrimination and oppression, and the event was turned into a civil rights march from Tucson to Phoenix.

Since 1994, pride in Tucson is held in October. 

In 2018, the parade, which was traditionally scheduled to take place on a Friday evening before the festival, was rescheduled to daytime hours, due to concerns within the LGBTQ+ community that holding a parade during the evening hours sends a bad message, as if the community is hiding in the shadows. In 2019 more than 5,000 people attended the event.

Over the years, Pride in the Desert has become a more family-centric theme.

Pride in the Desert became a virtual event for 2020, due to the COVID-19 pandemic. The event took place on October 24. The event returned in-person in 2022, which was also the event's 45th anniversary.

References

External links

1977 establishments in Arizona
Annual events in Arizona
Festivals in Tucson, Arizona
LGBT in Arizona
Pride parades in the United States
Recurring events established in 1977